Małgorzata Trybańska-Strońska (born 21 June 1981) is a Polish long jumper and with 14.44 m the current Polish triple jump record holder. She represented Poland at the World Championships in Athletics in 2007 and 2009, and has also competed at the European Athletics Championships on two occasions.

She improved the national indoor record at the Erdgas Hallen-Meeting in Chemnitz in January 2011, coming in second place with her jump of 14.16 m.

She is the sister of the first Polish NBA player, Cezary Trybański.

Achievements

Personal bests
Long jump - 6.80 m (2007)
Triple jump - 14.44 m (2010) NR

References

External links

1981 births
Living people
Polish female long jumpers
Polish female triple jumpers
Athletes from Warsaw